PLPA may refer to:
Professional Lacrosse Players' Association, for U.S. and Canada
Palmyra (Cooper) Airport (ICAO: PLPA), Palmyra Atoll in the Pacific Ocean